Mission Ridge is an unincorporated community in northern Stanley County, South Dakota, United States.  It lies along Highway 1806 north of the city of Fort Pierre, the county seat of Stanley County.  Its elevation is 1,985 feet (605 m).  Mission Ridge has a post office with the ZIP code of 57557.

The community was named for the elevated town site near Mission Creek.

References

Unincorporated communities in Stanley County, South Dakota
Unincorporated communities in South Dakota